Von Stülpnagel is a family of German nobility from the Uckermark. They were first documented in 1321 and can trace their lineage to Valentin von Stülpnagel, living in the middle of the 15th century.

Notable people with the last name Stülpnagel include:
Otto von Stülpnagel (1878–1948), general in charge of occupied France
Joachim Fritz Constantin von Stülpnagel (1880–1968), general in charge of the Replacement Army
Carl-Heinrich von Stülpnagel (1886–1944), German Second World War general.
Friedrich von Stülpnagel (1913–1996), Olympic athlete
Karina Jäger-von Stülpnagel (born 1972), ballet dancer

Notes

External links
vonstuelpnagel.de , Stülpnagel family web site

German noble families
Surnames
Military families of Germany